Ann Marks  (24July 19419October 2016) was a British physics teacher and science communicator.

Biography 
Marks obtained a scholarship and studied at the University of Liverpool, receiving a BSc in physics in 1963. She also trained as a Qualified Teacher. She moved to Grenoble in 1987 to work on the European Synchrotron Radiation Facility, before returning to England a few years later. Marks was heavily involved with volunteering for the Institute of Physics (IOP) Women in Physics Committee from 1995. Marks founded the UK Young Woman Physicist Award (now the Jocelyn Bell Burnell Medal and Prize) in 2007. She was also active with the European Platform of Women Scientists  (EPWS) at a similar time.

She ran very successful workshops, with the aim of attracting young girls into science. Marks was awarded Membership of the Order of the British Empire (MBE), for "services to Physics" in 2007. Marks often published articles about the status of women in Physics in the United Kingdom. Some of her publications were co-authored with Gillian Gehring.

Personal life 
Marks was married to Neil Marks, with whom she shared the Phillips Award in 2013. She was also a Methodist lay preacher.

Awards and honours 
 Membership of the Order of the British Empire, MBE, for “services to Physics”, 2007
 Institute of Physics Phillips Award for distinguished service (jointly with Neil Marks), 2013
 University of Liverpool/Institute of Physics Ann Marks memorial lecture and prize named in her honour, started in 2017

See also 
 Timeline of women in science

References

External links 
 https://epws.org/ann-marks/

1941 births
2016 deaths
Science communicators
Fellows of the Institute of Physics
British women academics